HMS Gnat was a Royal Navy . She was built by Lobnitz and launched in 1915. Gnat saw service during the First World War as part of a flotilla operating on the Tigris and Euphrates rivers. After the war, the vessel was transferred to China, where in 1927, Gnat took part in the Nanking Incident. Gnat began the Second World War still in China, but was towed to the Mediterranean Sea in 1940. There, the gunboat took part in an assault on Tobruk before being torpedoed by a German submarine. Though Gnat did not sink, and was beached at Alexandria, Egypt where the vessel was used as an anti-aircraft platform. The vessel was declared a constructive total loss and scrapped in 1945.

History
During the First World War, Gnat took part in the Mesopotamian Campaign as part of the gunboat squadron operating on the Euphrates and Tigris rivers.  In 1927 Gnat participated as part of a Royal Navy flotilla in the Nanking Incident, helping to protect British and other international citizens and business interests in China.

From 1936, Gnat had a "ship's dog", a pure-bred liver and white Pointer called Judy.

She then transferred to the Mediterranean Fleet's Inshore Squadron. She was torpedoed on 21 October 1941 by the  but did not sink was towed and beached at Alexandria and used as a fixed Anti-aircraft platform.

Declared a constructive total loss, she was finally scrapped in 1945.

References

Bibliography
 
 

 

Insect-class gunboats
1915 ships
Maritime incidents in October 1941